Gorodetsky (masculine), Gorodetskaya (feminine), or Gorodetskoye (neuter) may refer to:

Gorodetsky (surname)
Gorodetsky District, a district of Nizhny Novgorod Oblast, Russia
Gorodetsky (rural locality) (Gorodetskaya, Gorodetskoye), name of several rural localities in Russia

See also
Mayak Gorodetsky, a rural locality in Ostrovnoy, Murmansk Oblast, Russia